Tracy Ehlert is an American politician. She is a Democrat representing the 70th district in the Iowa House of Representatives.

Political career 

In 2017, Ehlert announced she was running to represent District 70 in the Iowa House of Representatives, after former representative Todd Taylor decided to run for a seat in the State Senate. She was unopposed in the Democratic primary, and went on to win the general election. She is running for re-election in 2020.

Ehlert currently sits on the following committees:
 Economic Growth
 Education
 Human Resources
 Labor
 Education Appropriations Subcommittee

Electoral record

References 

Living people
Politicians from Cedar Rapids, Iowa
Democratic Party members of the Iowa House of Representatives
Women state legislators in Iowa
Year of birth missing (living people)
21st-century American politicians
21st-century American women politicians